Maung Maung Soe (born 6 August 1995) is a footballer from Burma, and a striker for the Myanmar national football team and Magway FC.

References

Living people
Sportspeople from Yangon
Burmese footballers
Myanmar international footballers
Magway FC players
Association football forwards
1995 births
Footballers at the 2018 Asian Games
Association football wingers
Competitors at the 2017 Southeast Asian Games
Asian Games competitors for Myanmar
Southeast Asian Games competitors for Myanmar